A livestock guardian dog (LGD) is a dog type bred for the purpose of protecting livestock from predators.

Livestock guardian dogs stay with the group of animals they protect as a full-time member of the flock or herd. Their ability to guard their herd is mainly instinctive, as the dog is bonded to the herd from an early age. Unlike herding dogs which control the movement of livestock, LGDs blend in with them, watching for intruders within the flock. The mere presence of a guardian dog is usually enough to ward off some predators, and LGDs confront predators by vocal intimidation, barking, and displaying very aggressive behavior. The dog may attack or fight with a predator if it cannot drive it away.

History

Herding dogs originated in Western Asia, on the territory of modern Iran and Iraq in association with the beginning of livestock breeding. Domestication of sheep and goats began there in the 8-7th millennium BC. Back then shepherding was a difficult job: first shepherds did not have horses and managed livestock on foot, as mules, horses and donkeys were not yet fully domesticated and obedient enough. Dogs that previously were helping humans to hunt, became assistants in farming. The main task of dogs in the early period was to protect herds from a variety of wild predators, that were very numerous at that time.

This function predetermined the type of herding dogs: they had to be strong, vicious, courageous, decisive, able to stand alone against a large predator and, most importantly, ready to defend their herd. The ancestors of livestock guarding dogs can be traced back to six thousand years ago, archaeological findings of joint remains of sheep and dogs date back to 3685 BC. The land of their origin is considered to be the territories of modern Turkey, Iraq and Syria.

Livestock dogs are mentioned in the Old Testament, the works of Cato the Elder and Varro. Images are found on works of art created more than two thousand years ago.

Their use being recorded as early as 150 BC in Rome. Both Aristotle's History of Animals and Virgil's Georgics mention the use of livestock guardian dogs by the Molossians in the ancient region of Epirus.

Purpose and working features  

Livestock guardian dogs specialise in protection of small farm animals, mainly sheep. Unlike herds of cattle or horses, which are able to withstand even large predators on their own, herds of sheep and goats need the protection that LGDs are designed to provide. In large farms, sheep are managed mainly by using the distant-pasture method. In winter the flocks are kept in low-lying pastures or in paddocks, and in the summer they are moved to remote regions, often to the mountains, where there is enough grass during the summer drought. LGDs guard livestock on pastures throughout the year, and also protect sheep from attacks of predators during seasonal migrations.

The dogs are introduced to livestock as puppies so they "imprint" on the animals. Experts recommend that the pups begin living with the herd at 4 to 5 weeks of age. This imprinting is thought to be largely olfactory and occurs between 3 and 16 weeks of age. Training requires regular daily handling and management, preferably from birth. A guardian dog is not considered reliable until it is at least 2 years of age. Until that time, supervision, guidance, and correction are needed to teach the dog the skills and rules it needs to do its job. Having older dogs that assist in training younger dogs streamlines this process considerably.
Trials are underway to protect penguins with LGDs.

In Namibia in Southwest Africa, Anatolians are used to guard goat herds from cheetahs, and are typically imprinted between 7 and 8 weeks of age. Before use of dogs was implemented, impoverished Namibian farmers often came into conflict with predatory cheetahs; now, Anatolians usually are able to drive off cheetahs with their barking and displays of aggression.

The experiments of Lorna and Raymond Coppinger and the studies of other specialists have shown the effectiveness of protecting flocks with the help of dogs. After the reintroduction of wolves, that were eliminated in the United States in the 1930s, American farmers were losing about a million sheep annually to wolf attacks. 76 farmers took part in the Coppingers program, which introduced European livestock guardian dogs into the US sheep breeding (in their project they used Anatolian Shepherd Dogs). In all farms, where, in the absence of dogs, up to two hundred attacks of wolves per year happened, not a single sheep was lost under the protection of LGDs. At the same time, none of the predators protected by law got killed: the dogs simply did not allow them to approach the herd.

For the protection of flocks, on average, five dogs are used per 350 heads of sheep, but the need for LGDs depends on many conditions, such as the landscape and size of the territory, vegetation available in the pasture area, the species, breed and number of animals in the herd, the presence of a shepherd, the presence or absence of fences and other means of protection, the number and species composition of predators, as well as the breed, age, health status of LGDs and their experience.

For example, sheep breeders of the Rocky Mountains in the United States breed predominantly white-headed Rambouillet sheep with a strong herd instinct. During the day, the sheep scatter over the pasture ​that is ​about one square mile, and at night they gather in a denser flock. In an ordinary flock of a thousand ewes and their lambs, two to five guard dogs live constantly. The number of dogs in a herd can change with their death or the birth of puppies. When the herds gather together for the winter, some dogs can move to another herd and spend the next summer guarding other sheep. When large predators appear near pastures, the number of dogs in the flock usually increases. Protection is more reliable if the herd is guarded by dogs of different breeds, for example, powerful Pyrenean mastiffs, who prefer to lie close to livestock, in cooperation with more mobile Maremmas or Kangals, who control the perimeter of the pasture.

Traits

Temperament and working ethic 

The three qualities most sought after in LGDs are trustworthiness, attentiveness, and protectiveness; trustworthy in that they do not roam off and are not aggressive with the livestock, attentive in that they are situationally aware of threats by predators, and protective in that they attempt to drive off predators. Dogs, being social creatures with differing personalities, take on different roles with the herd and among themselves; most stick close to the livestock, others tend to follow the shepherd or rancher when one is present, and some drift away from the livestock.  These differing roles are often complementary in terms of protecting livestock, and experienced ranchers and shepherds sometimes encourage these differences by adjustments in socialization technique so as to increase the effectiveness of their group of dogs in meeting specific predator threats. LGDs that follow the livestock closest assure that a guard dog is on hand if a predator attacks, while LGDs that patrol at the edges of a flock or herd are in a position to keep would-be attackers at a safe distance from livestock.  Those dogs that are more attentive tend to alert those that are more passive, but perhaps also more trustworthy or less aggressive with the livestock.

At least two dogs may be placed with a flock or herd, depending on its size, the type of predators, their number, and the intensity of predation. If predators are scarce, one dog may be adequate, though most operations usually require at least two dogs. Large operations (particularly range operations) and heavy predator loads require more dogs. Male and female LGDs have proved to be equally effective in protecting of livestock.

While LGDs have been known to fight to the death with predators, in most cases, predator attacks are prevented by a display of aggressiveness. LGDs are known to drive off predators for which physically they would be no match, such as bears and even lions. With the reintroduction of predators into natural habitats in Europe and North America, environmentalists have come to appreciate LGDs because they allow sheep and cattle farming to coexist with predators in the same or nearby habitats. Unlike trapping and poisoning, LGDs seldom kill predators; instead, their aggressive behaviors tend to condition predators to seek unguarded (thus, nonfarm animal) prey. For instance, in Italy's Gran Sasso National Park, where LGDs and wolves have coexisted for centuries, older, more experienced wolves seem to "know" the LGDs and leave their flocks alone.

Physical traits 
LGD's are large, powerful dogs, although smaller dogs drive wild animals away from the herd just as effectively. The large size provides guardian dogs with a number of advantages: they retain heat longer, carry more fat reserves and can go without food for longer, are less likely to get bone fractures and tolerate illnesses better. Their stride is longer, so they are more efficient at long distances. However, dogs that are too large suffer more from the heat, therefore they are used exclusively in the northern regions and in mountain pastures. Livestock guardian dogs working with the herds in hot areas are lighter in bone and shorter.

All LGD's have similar physical traits. Differences in appearance reflect the peculiarities of the climate in which these dogs live and work. All LGD's have a dense water-repellent coat, strong build, and independent disposition. Differences in the colour are determined by local traditions: puppies of a typical colour were given preference for breeding in different regions. Rigg notes that often the color of dogs is chosen according to the main color of the livestock: in flocks of white sheep, the dogs are white, with coloured sheep, goats or yaks, the dogs are usually grey or brown. It is assumed that animals are calmer about being in a presence of dogs of a similar color. In addition, the color of the dog corresponding to the color of the herd reduces the risk of accidental death of the dog when shooting wolves.

Livestock guardian dogs in modern world
LGDs are generally large, independent, and protective, which can make them less than ideal for urban or even suburban living. Nonetheless, despite their size, they can be gentle, make good companion dogs, and are often protective towards children. If introduced to a family as a pup, most LGDs are as protective of their family as a working guard dog is of its flock. In fact, in some communities where LGDs are a tradition, the runt of a litter often was kept or given as a household pet or simply kept as a village dog without a single owner.

For various reasons, including the decline in livestock and the transition to other methods of livestock breeding and management, in many regions, the number of LGDs has critically declined. Instead of their original purpose, livestock guardian dogs are more often used to guard property, bred as show dogs with a spectacular appearance, and sometimes used in dog fight business. The breed standards used by canine organisations in purebred breeding and their selection process are mainly focused on physical characteristics and not on their ability to protect the herd. In the absence of a traditional guarding purpose and selection associated with it, hereditary guarding skills and key working qualities of LGDs get lost.

Some breeds of LGDs are kept mainly as pets (Pyrenean mountain dog). Some working breeds (the Karakachan dog in Bulgaria, the Portuguese LGD breeds) are on the verge of extinction, others (Kuchi dog in Afghanistan, the Mazandarani saga dog in Iran) are considered completely lost.

Nonetheless, livestock breeding remains an important part of agriculture, and livestock guardian dogs are still the most efficient and sustainable way of protecting the herds. LGDs invariably remain an integral part of the industry in places of traditional sheep breeding, where large carnivores have survived. Such as the Carpathian and Balkan regions, in central Italy, on the Iberian Peninsula, in the mountain regions of the Middle East and Central Asia.

In Western and Northern Europe, where large predators were reintroduced in the end of the 20th century, shepherds are going back to using LGDs as the only way to protect farm animals from harm in a way that is not lethal to legally protected predators. Thanks to this advantage, LGDs are now used to protect herds in the US, Scandinavia, and a number of African countries, even despite the absence of such a tradition in these regions. The use of livestock guardian dogs for the protection of herds reduces losses of animals between 11% and 100%, without requiring significant investments, special technologies and government assistance. Attempts to return the LGDs into agriculture are supported by government programs and public organisations in a number of countries.

List of breeds
Many breeds of LGDs are little known outside of the regions where they are still worked. Nevertheless, some breeds are known to display traits advantageous to guarding livestock. Some specialist LGD breeds include:

Extant breeds

List of extinct breeds

See also
Cão de Gado Transmontano
Guard dog
Komondor
Kuvasz
Maremmano-Abruzzese Sheepdog
Tibetan Mastiff
Wolf collar

References

Citations

Bibliography

Further reading

External links

Livestock Guardian Dog Association
Livestock and Wolves: A Guide to Nonlethal Tools and Methods to Reduce Conflicts, 2nd Edition
Guarding Dogs: from the Transhumance to Pre-Zygotic Selection by Raymond Coppinger and Lorna Coppinger
 Livestock guarding dogs: their current use world wide by Robin Rigg, a comprehensive review of current livestock guarding dog use
Livestock Guarding Dogs: Protecting Sheep from Predators, a USDA publication
Attention, Sheep Grazing in this Area: Livestock Protection Dogs in Use, a USDA warning sign
in-depth video about LGD use by shepherds from OPB
Guardian Dogs: Best Practice Manual for the use of Livestock Guardian Dogs from Invasive Animals Cooperative Research Centre of Australia
Livestock Guardian Dogs at Work: Another Side of The Great Pyrenees Mountain Dog
German Shepherd Dog

Dog types
Working dogs
Livestock